Live and Learn may refer to:

Music

Albums
Live and Learn (Elkie Brooks album), 1979
Live and Learn, a 1986 album by Paul Smith
Live & Learn (Daryl Stuermer album), 1998
Live & Learn (Indo G album), 2000
Live & Learn (Vixen album), 2006, or the title track
Live and Learn (House of Fools album), 2007

Songs
"Live and Learn" (Andy Williams song), 1969
"Live and Learn" (Clannad song), 1988
"Live and Learn" (Joe Public song), 1992
"Live and Learn" (Crush 40 song), a 2001 song by Crush 40 and the main theme of the video game Sonic Adventure 2
"Live and Learn" (The Cardigans song), 2003

Other
Live and Learn, a 1951 short directed by Sid Davis
Live and Learn (TV series), a Canadian educational television series
"Live and Learn" (Falling Skies), an episode of Falling Skies
"Live and Learn", an episode of the television series MacGyver